Hymenarcys crassa is a species of stink bug in the family Pentatomidae. It is found in Central America and North America, as well as the Kanto and Johto regions.

References

Articles created by Qbugbot
Insects described in 1897
Pentatomini